Sunil Kumar Yadav (Jitendra) (born Sunil Kumar Yadav  Nepali: सुनील कुमार यादव) is a Nepali politician. He is a current member of the Nepalese Constituent Assembly and the Legislative Parliament.

Sunil Kumar Yadav Born on December 14, 1981 in Phatuha Harshaha-3 of Rautahat, a mahasamiti member of NC, Sunil Kumar Yadav plunged into politics in 1996 and served as a unit chairperson at Nepal Student Union (NSU) at Thakur Ram Multiple Campus, Birgunj.

A graduate in political sciences Yadav elected as a secretary to Free Student Union of the campus in 2003. He was elected thrice as a convention representative and thrice as a district vice chairperson of NSU.
Son of Anaruddha Prasad and Kalawati Devi Yadav, Yadav serves as a representative to general assembly and a district member of NC. He also serves as a member at Danphe Nepal, a NGO.

References 

Nepali Congress politicians from Madhesh Province
1981 births
Living people
People from Rautahat District
Tribhuvan University alumni
Members of the 2nd Nepalese Constituent Assembly